Autoroute 30 (A-30), or the Autoroute de l'Acier (In English, Steel Freeway) is an Autoroute in Quebec, Canada. Construction of the A-30 dates back to the early days of autoroute construction in the 1960s. Originally called Highway 3, the A-30 was designed to replace Route 132 as the main artery linking the communities along the South Shore of the St. Lawrence River.  The A-30 was originally intended to begin at the U.S. border near Dundee and end at Saint-Pierre-les-Becquets (in Centre-du-Québec). In the late 1970s an eight-year moratorium on new autoroute construction in favour of public transport by the Parti Québécois prevented implementation of that plan.

The original section of Autoroute 30 in 1968 linked Sorel-Tracy to Route 116, which was then called Highway 9. The A-30 was extended to an interchange with Autoroute 10 in Brossard by 1985 and to Autoroute 15 in Candiac by 1996.

Growing road congestion in and around Montreal led to the announcement in 2006 of a federal-provincial partnership to complete A-30 as southwestern bypass ring road. At that time, the section from Châteauguay to Vaudreuil-Dorion was to be tolled, however by 2009 it was decided to collect tolls only on the St. Lawrence bridge. A-30 was extended north of the St. Lawrence River (over a new crossing) to a realigned interchange with Autoroute 20 and Autoroute 540 in Vaudreuil-Dorion, afterward A-540 was annexed and renamed as an extension of A-30. As construction progressed, short sections of the original A-30 that are bypassed by the new route were converted to spur routes and assigned new route numbers; for instance the old alignment of A-30 south of Salaberry-de-Valleyfield was renamed Autoroute 530. Opened to traffic on December 15, 2012, the realigned Autoroute 30 permits motorists travelling the Quebec City–Windsor Corridor to bypass Montreal.

Description
There are two discontinuous sections of A-30:

Montérégie
The main  segment extends from Autoroute 40 in Vaudreuil-Dorion to Route 133 in Sorel-Tracy.

From the junction of Autoroute 20 in Vaudreuil-Dorion to Route 138 in Châteauguay a completely new freeway was constructed between 2007 and 2012, opening to traffic in December 2012. This new section, built under a Public-Private Partnership, along with the former A-540 west of Vaudreuil make up the first  of the highway now. The Kahnawake bypass was built following the 1990 Oka Crisis and extended to the other three communities between 2005 and 2011. The A-30 was originally intended to supplant Route 132, crossing Kahnawake to a junction with the Honoré Mercier Bridge. Local opposition to the proposed route from the late 1960s coupled with the disruption of the Oka Crisis in 1990 prompted the decision to change the course of the new autoroute to bypass the Mohawk territory This new alignment resulted in the 1990 construction, 1992 twinning, then the 2010 redesignation of a  portion of highway as Autoroute 730. The A-730 now extends from the A-30 mainline in Saint-Constant to Route 132 in Sainte-Catherine. Another  section from the existing A-30 to Route 132 in Candiac has been redesignated Autoroute 930 since construction of the Jean-Leman section ended in November 2011. Further west, an  bypass of Salaberry-de-Valleyfield became Autoroute 
530 in 2012 when construction of the A-30 extension was completed.

Northeast of Montreal the autoroute parallels Route 132, bypassing the steelmaking centres of Contrecoeur and Sorel-Tracy.

Centre-du-Québec
An 18.3 km super two segment in Bécancour, from Route 132 immediately west to an interchange with Autoroute 55 (near Laviolette Bridge, south of Trois-Rivières). The A-30 parallels the St. Lawrence River, bypassing the communities of Sainte-Angèle-de-Laval and Des Ormeaux and linking the Port of Bécancour to the autoroute network. Multiplexed with Route 132, the A-30 continues as a two-lane road for a short distance further before ending at the western approach to Gentilly. The road continues on as Route 132.

Exit list

Extension of Autoroute 30 (Montreal Bypass Project)

The completion of Autoroute 30 as a southern bypass was intended to better integrate greater Montreal's network of autoroutes, significantly reduce transit time to and through the region, boost economic activity in Montérégie, and improve access to markets in Ontario (via Ontario highways 401 and 417) and the United States (via Interstates 87 and 89). This new section was completed on December 15, 2012. The westernmost section was financed through a public–private partnership, in which the government contracted with Acciona (a Spanish engineering and construction company) to design, construct, operate, maintain, and finance the autoroute. The eastern section of the A-30 extension was publicly funded.

Candiac–Châteauguay

Construction of this portion of the A-30—from an interchange with the A-15 (and the spur A-930) in Candiac to Châteauguay—began in 2005 and opened to traffic on November 19, 2010. This section was linked to the A-30 mainline in November 2011. 
Motorists using A-30 can quickly access New York via the A-15 and Interstate 87.

Châteauguay – Vaudreuil-Dorion

A new  four-lane divided highway has been constructed, and opened to traffic on December 15, 2012. The A-30 crosses the St. Lawrence River to a redesigned interchange with A-20 and the former A-540. The new river crossing expedites the region's access to Toronto via A-20 and Ontario Highway 401.

A-540, a short spur road connecting A-20 with A-40, was re-designated A-30 once construction was complete. Thus, A-30's ultimate western terminus is at the junction with A-40, providing access to Ottawa and eastern Ontario via Ontario Highway 417.

Salaberry-de-Valleyfield

This spur route links the re-aligned A-30 mainline with Salaberry-de-Valleyfield. A-530 features two interchanges, one at boulevard Pie XII and the other at Route 201.

References

External links

 A30 Express Transponder
 Nouvelle Autoroute 30 S.E.N.C. (construction site)
 Map of future Autoroute 30
 The completion of Autoroute 30 (Autoroute 30 Official website)
 De L'Acier Autoroute (A-30) at MontrealRoads.com
 Transports Quebec Map 
 A-30 at motorways-exits.com
 A-30 at Quebec Autoroutes

30
Public–private partnership projects in Canada
Ring roads in Canada
Toll roads in Canada